Gentlewoman, Ruby Man is a cover album by English singer and songwriter Flo Morrissey and American musician Matthew E. White, released on 13 January 2017 by Glassnote Records. The album consists of a series of versions of tracks by artists such as Frank Ocean, The Velvet Underground, Leonard Cohen, James Blake, and the Bee Gees.

Track listing

References 

2017 albums
Glassnote Records albums
Matthew E. White albums
Flo Morrissey albums
Collaborative albums
Indie folk albums by American artists
Indie folk albums by English artists